Ernest Miller (November 22, 1869 – October 9, 1924) was a Canadian politician. He served in the Legislative Assembly of British Columbia from 1909 to 1916  from the electoral district of Grand Forks, as a Conservative. He was a lawyer.

He died in Vancouver on October 9, 1924.

References

External links
 

British Columbia Conservative Party MLAs
1869 births
1924 deaths